Falafel is a deep-fried ball or patty-shaped fritter in Middle Eastern cuisine (especially in Levantine and  Egyptian cuisines) made from ground chickpeas, broad beans, or both. Nowadays, falafel is often served in a pita, samoon, or wrapped in a flatbread known as taboon; "falafel" also frequently refers to a wrapped sandwich that is prepared in this way. The falafel balls may be topped with salads, pickled vegetables, hot sauce, and drizzled with tahini-based sauces. Falafel balls may also be eaten alone as a snack or served as part of a meze tray (assortment of appetizers).

Falafel is eaten throughout the Middle East and is a common street food. Falafel is usually made with fava beans in Egypt, where it most likely originated, and with chickpeas in the Levant, Iraq and Bahrain. It is popular with vegetarians worldwide.

Etymology

The word  is of Arabic origin and is the plural of  'pepper', borrowed from Persian , cognate with the Sanskrit word  'long pepper'; or an earlier , from Aramaic  'small round thing, peppercorn', derived from palpēl 'to be round, roll'.

The name  is used world-wide. In English (where it has been written falafel, felafel, filafel and filafil), it is first attested in 1936.

The word is derived from a diminutive form of the Arabic word  ("food"); the particular form indicates "a unit" of the given root in this case  (having to do with taste and food), thus meaning "a little piece of food" or "small tasty thing".

The word falafel can refer to the fritters themselves or to sandwiches filled with them.

History

The origin of falafel is controversial. The dish most likely originated in Egypt. There is a legend that a fava bean version was eaten by Coptic Christians in the Roman era as early as the 4th century during Lent, but there is no documented evidence for this. It has been speculated that its history may go back to Pharaonic Egypt. However, the earliest written references to falafel from Egyptian sources date to the 19th century, and oil was probably too expensive to use for deep frying in ancient Egypt.

As Alexandria is a port city, it was possible to export the dish and its name to other areas in the Middle East. The dish later migrated northwards to the Levant, Iraq and Bahrain, where chickpeas replaced the fava beans.

Middle East
Falafel is a common form of street food or fast food in Egypt as well as the Levant, Iraq and Bahrain. The croquettes are regularly eaten as part of meze. During Ramadan, falafel balls are sometimes eaten as part of the iftar, the meal that breaks the daily fast after sunset. Falafel became so popular that McDonald's for a time served a "McFalafel" in its breakfast menu in Egypt. Falafel is still popular in the Coptic diet, and as such large volumes are cooked during religious holidays. Falafel is consumed as part of Lent diet by Christians in Arab countries.

Debates over the history of falafel have sometimes devolved into political discussions about the relationship between Arabs and Israeli Jews. In modern times, falafel has been considered a national dish of Egypt, Israel, and the State of Palestine.

Falafel plays an iconic role in Israeli cuisine and is widely considered to be a national dish of the country. Falafel was never a specific Jewish dish but was consumed by Syrian and Egyptian Jews. Later, it was adopted in the diet of early Jewish immigrants to the Jewish communities of Ottoman Syria. As it is plant-based, Jewish dietary laws classify it as pareve and thus allow it to be eaten with both meat and dairy meals. Many Palestinians resent what they see as an appropriation of their dish by Israelis. Additionally, the Lebanese Industrialists' Association has raised assertions of copyright infringement against Israel concerning falafel.

Europe 
Waves of migration – principally of Arabs and Turks – had taken it through Europe. In Germany in particular, where a large Turkish population put down roots, it enjoyed huge popularity. At first it was a dish consumed principally by migrants; but by the early 1970s, the appearance of Turkish food stalls and restaurants made it available to a growing number of hungry Germans, which led to yet another transformation of its recipe.

North America

In North America, prior to the 1970s, falafel was found only in Middle Eastern, Mediterranean and Jewish neighborhoods and restaurants. Today, the dish is a common and popular street food in many cities throughout North America.

Vegetarianism

Falafel has become popular among vegetarians and vegans, as an alternative to meat-based street foods, and is now sold in packaged mixes in health-food stores. While traditionally thought of as being used to make veggie burgers, its use has expanded as more and more people have adopted it as a source of protein. In the United States, falafel's versatility has allowed for the reformulating of recipes for meatloaf, sloppy joes and spaghetti and meatballs into vegetarian dishes.

Preparation and variations

Falafel is made from fava beans or chickpeas, or a combination. Chickpeas are common in most Middle Eastern countries. The dish is usually made with chickpeas in the Levant (Syria, Lebanon, Jordan, Israel, Palestine, Turkey), Iraq, and Bahrain. This version is the most popular in the West. The Egyptian variety uses only fava beans.

When chickpeas are used, they are not cooked prior to use (cooking the chickpeas will cause the falafel to fall apart, requiring adding some flour to use as a binder). Instead they are soaked (sometimes with baking soda) overnight, then ground together with various ingredients such as parsley, scallions, and garlic. Spices such as cumin and coriander are often added to the beans for added flavor. The dried fava beans are soaked in water and then stone ground with leek, parsley, green coriander, cumin and dry coriander. The mixture is shaped into balls or patties. This can be done by hand or with a tool called an aleb falafel (falafel mould). The mixture is usually deep fried, or it can be oven baked.

Falafel is typically ball-shaped, but is sometimes made in other shapes. The inside of falafel may be green (from green herbs such as parsley or green onion), or tan. Sometimes sesame seeds are added on top of the falafel before frying it.

The pita falafel sandwich was popularized after Israel's independence and in the 1950s by Jewish Yemeni immigrants. Yemeni Jews were the first to introduce the concept of serving falafel in a pita with condiments. A 19 October 1939 The Palestine Post article is the first mention of the concept of falafels served in a pita bread as a street food. When served as a sandwich, falafel is often wrapped with flatbread or stuffed in a hollow pita bread, or it can be served with flat or unleavened bread. Tomatoes, lettuce, cucumbers, and other garnishes can be added. Falafel is commonly accompanied by tahini sauce.

Nutrition

When made with chickpeas, falafel is high in protein, complex carbohydrates, and fiber. Key nutrients are calcium, iron, magnesium, phosphorus, potassium, zinc, copper, manganese, vitamin C, thiamine, pantothenic acid, vitamin B, and folate. Phytochemicals include beta-carotene. Falafel is high in soluble fiber, which has been shown to be effective in lowering blood cholesterol.

Chickpeas are low in fat and contain initially no cholesterol, but a considerable amount of fat is absorbed during the frying process. Falafel can instead be baked to avoid the high fat content associated with frying.

References

External links

 New York Times Recipe of the Day for 12 February 2008

Chickpea dishes
Middle Eastern cuisine
Arab cuisine
Egyptian cuisine
Israeli cuisine
Palestinian cuisine
Lebanese cuisine
Syrian cuisine
Jordanian cuisine
Iraqi cuisine
Bahraini cuisine
National dishes
Vegan cuisine
Street food
Vegetarian sandwiches
Fritters
Lenten foods